Sarah Ens (born 1992) is a Canadian poet and editor from Winnipeg, Manitoba.

Career
Ens began publishing poetry in the 2010s, and published her first collection of poetry, The World is Mostly Sky, in 2020, published by Turnstone Press. Her second work, Flyway is a long poem published in 2022. Her 2020 collection The World is Mostly Sky was a finalist for the 2021 McNally Robinson Book of the Year Award and the Landsdowne Prize for Poetry in 2022. She has edited and copy edited works of fiction, non-fiction, and poetry, and also works as publicist at University of Manitoba Press.

Personal
Raised in Landmark, Manitoba, Ens studied creative writing at the University of British Columbia and completed an MFA in writing at the University of Saskatchewan.

External links

References

Writers from Winnipeg
Writers from Manitoba
21st-century Canadian poets
Canadian women poets
Mennonite writers
Mennonite poets
Canadian Mennonites
University of British Columbia alumni
University of Saskatchewan alumni
1992 births
Living people
People from Eastman Region, Manitoba